Raxlee Taylor (born 20 March 1995) is an Indian cricketer who plays for Gujarat. He made his Twenty20 debut on 3 January 2016 in the 2015–16 Syed Mushtaq Ali Trophy. He made his List A debut on 26 January 2016 in the 2015–16 Deodhar Trophy.

References

External links
 

1995 births
Living people
Indian cricketers
Gujarat cricketers
Cricketers from Ahmedabad